Cornelius Mortimer Treat (April 25, 1817 – July 28, 1916) was an American teacher, farmer, and politician.

Born in Angelica, New York, Treat moved with his mother to Monroe County, New York in 1820. In 1836, Treat and his mother then moved to New London, Ohio and settled on a farm. During the winter Treat would teach school. In 1847, Treat, his mother and family moved to Rock County, Wisconsin and settled on a farm in the town of Turtle. Treat hauled goods between Janesville, Wisconsin and Belvidere, Illinois; he also leased and ran a hotel in Belvidere, Illinois. He served as town superintendent of schools and as county superintendent of schools. In 1863, Treat served in the Wisconsin State Assembly and was an independent. In 1868, Treat moved to Clinton, Wisconsin and was in the fire insurance business. Treat died at his home in Clinton, Wisconsin.

Notes

1817 births
1916 deaths
People from Angelica, New York
People from Monroe County, New York
People from New London, Ohio
People from Clinton, Rock County, Wisconsin
Educators from Ohio
Educators from Wisconsin
Farmers from Ohio
Farmers from Wisconsin
Businesspeople from Illinois
Businesspeople from Wisconsin
Wisconsin Independents
Members of the Wisconsin State Assembly
19th-century American politicians
People from Turtle, Wisconsin
Educators from New York (state)